Gloucester Shire was a local government area in the Mid North Coast and Upper Hunter regions of New South Wales, Australia. The Shire was situated adjacent to the Bucketts Way and the North Coast railway line.

The last mayor of the Gloucester Shire Council was Cr. John Rosenbaum, an independent politician.

Towns and localities 
The Shire included the following towns and localities:

 Gloucester
 Barrington
 Copeland
 Craven
 Stratford

Amalgamation
A 2015 review of local government boundaries by the NSW Government Independent Pricing and Regulatory Tribunal recommended that the Gloucester Shire merge with adjoining councils. The government considered two proposals. Following the lodging of an alternate proposal by Gloucester Shire Council to amalgamate the Gloucester, Great Lakes and Greater Taree councils, the NSW Minister for Local Government proposed a merger between the Dungog Shire and City of Maitland.

The council was dissolved on 12 May 2016 and the area included in the Mid-Coast Council, along with city of Greater Taree and Great Lakes Council.

Demographics
Aboriginal and Torres Strait Islander people made up 4.7 per cent of the population, which was significantly higher than the national and state averages of 2.5 per cent. The median age of people in the Gloucester Shire was 50 years, which was significantly higher than the national median of 37 years. Children aged 0 – 14 years made up 16.0 per cent of the population and people aged 65 years and over made up 26.0 per cent of the population. Of people in the area aged 15 years and over, 54.7 per cent were married and 13.1 per cent were either divorced or separated.

When compared with total population growth of Australia for the same periods, being 5.78 per cent and 8.32 per cent respectively, population growth in the Gloucester Shire local government area was approximately one-third of the national average. The median weekly income for residents within the Gloucester Shire was significantly lower than the national average.

Meanwhile, as at the census date, compared to the national average, households in the Gloucester Shire local government area had a significantly lower than average proportion (2.0 per cent) where two or more languages are spoken (national average was 20.4 per cent); and a significantly higher proportion (96.0 per cent) where English only was spoken at home (national average was 76.8 per cent).

Council

Composition and election method 
At the time of dissolution, Gloucester Shire Council was composed of seven councillors, elected proportionally as a single ward. All councillors were elected for a fixed four-year term of office. The mayor was elected by the councillors at the first meeting of the council. The last election was held on 8 September 2012, and the makeup of the council was as follows:

The last Council, elected in 2012 and dissolved in 2016, in order of election, was:

References 

Hunter Region
2016 disestablishments in Australia
Former local government areas of New South Wales